Tri-City Airport  is a public-use airport 12 miles west of Parsons, a city in Labette County, Kansas, United States. It serves Coffeyville, Independence, and Parsons, Kansas.

In 1942 it was the Cherryvale Army Air Force Auxiliary Field #9 for the Independence Army Airfield; later it was called Pep Field.

Historical airline service 

Airline service to the area started in the early 1930s when National Air Transport stopped at Coffeyville on a route between Chicago and Dallas. In 1951 Ozark Airlines began a route from Kansas City to Tulsa stopping at Topeka, Coffeyville (McGugin Field), and Bartlesville, OK. Ozark's service to Coffeyville ended in 1954 but the airline continued to serve nearby Pittsburg, Kansas. In 1961 Central Airlines Douglas DC-3s began flying to Tri-City Airport (PPF) on a Kansas City - Parsons - Bartlesville - Oklahoma City route. Central Airlines merged into the original Frontier Airlines in 1967, and Frontier Convair 580s landed at Tri-City until 1977. From 1977 until 1986 PPF was served by Air Midwest with 17-seat Swearingen Metroliners to Kansas City and Wichita. Just before PPF service ended in 1986, Air Midwest began a codeshare agreement with Eastern Airlines and operated as Eastern Express. PPF has not seen airline flights since 1986.

Facilities
Its single runway, 17/35, is 5,000 by 75 feet (1,524 x 23 m).

In the year ending July 3, 2008 the airport had 6,000 aircraft operations, average 16 per day: 92% general aviation, 5% air taxi and 3% military. 15 aircraft were then based at this airport: 87% single-engine and 13% multi-engine.

References

External links 
 Aerial photo as of 7 October 1991 from USGS The National Map via MSR Maps
 

Airports in Kansas
Buildings and structures in Labette County, Kansas